The Winter of 1985–1986 in Great Britain and Ireland contained two periods of notably cold weather. March and April were also below average, especially April which was the coldest since 1922 with an average temperature of just .

Timeline
Below is a timeline of the notable events of each month that took place during this winter.

November 1985
This month also contained the second lowest November temperature recorded in the UK,  at Kinbrace on the 30th.

The winter began with a very severe frost on 14 November in parts of southeast England where  was recorded. It was then slightly less cold until the 27th when it turned very wintry and cold again, especially in Scotland. Temperatures were below freezing for most places from the 27th-29th. On the night of the 28th/29th,  was recorded in parts of central Scotland. Then, late on the 30th, much warmer air spread in from the southwest leading to exceptionally mild weather. Overall, snow fell on up to 19 days in parts of Scotland.

December 1985
The month began exceptionally mild with Chivenor, Devon recording  which is the highest December temperature ever recorded in England. It was generally milder than average up until Christmas Day when a cold snap began that mainly effected the north. Snow showers started falling and there was a temperature of  recorded at Glenlivet on the 30th. Overall, much of the country was wetter than average with isolated areas in south east England, south west England and eastern Scotland recording over 200% of average rainfall.

January 1986
The month was also wetter than average with some places in Northern England recording 200% of the average January rainfall. On the 28th and 29th a low moved south east over Great Britain bringing snow to parts of Central England northwards. This then turned the wind into the east, setting up the pattern for the bitterly cold February that followed.

February 1986
It was also the 5th coldest February since records began in 1659. Throughout the month, snow cover was widespread as temperatures did not get high enough for it to melt away. It was also very dull in the east with Cupar, Fife only recording 41 hours of sunshine all month. Conversely, in the west it was an exceptionally dry and sunny month with Anglesey recording 144 hours of sunshine and some stations in western Britain recording no precipitation all month. The month had persistently low daytime temperatures with the highest all month being only  at Buxton and Widdybank Fell, County Durham recorded 32 consecutive days below freezing. Early in the month there was also some freezing rain in the North and Midlands with 50mm (2") of glaze being recorded at Buxton.

March 1986
The cold weather of February persisted into early March, with blizzards in England on the 1st and a temperature of  recorded at Aviemore. The thaw began in all areas on the 4th. Later in the month it was very windy with a gust of  recorded on the 20th at Cairngorm.

April 1986
There was 19 days of snow at Glenlivet. It was also a wetter than average month.

References

1985 in Ireland
1986 in Ireland
1985 in the United Kingdom
1986 in the United Kingdom
1985 meteorology
1986 meteorology
Winter weather events in Ireland
Winter weather events in the United Kingdom